Loomis Family Farm, also known as the Loomis-Sharpe Farm, is a historic home and farm located at Oxford, Chenango County, New York. The farmhouse was built in 1832 and is a two-story, five-bay sandstone residence with a center entrance.  Also on the property are the contributing dairy barn and silo (c. 1879), a carriage barn (c. 1870s), a corn crib / granary (c. 1871), a small barn (c. 1870s), a smokehouse, a spring-fed water trough, a well with a stone lid, a milk cooler, a stone horse barn foundation, and the ruins of a sugar house.

It was added to the National Register of Historic Places in 2014.

References

Farms on the National Register of Historic Places in New York (state)
Houses completed in 1833
Houses in Chenango County, New York
National Register of Historic Places in Chenango County, New York